Herbert Derek Williams (9 December 1922 – 13 July 2019) was an English footballer, who played as a wing half in the Football League for Chester.

References

External links

1922 births
2019 deaths
Chester City F.C. players
Association football wing halves
English Football League players
English footballers
People from Ellesmere Port